Angelina Baiden-Amissah (born 8 February 1954) is a Ghanaian politician and a former member of parliament for the Shama constituency of the Western Region of Ghana.

Politics 
Baiden-Amissah was a member of the 4th parliament of the 4th republic as a representative of the Shama constituency.  She was also a member of the 3rd parliament of the 4th republic of Ghana. Her Political Career begun in 2000 when she contested in the 2000 Ghanaian General elections as a parliamentary candidate on the ticket of the New Patriotic Party.She won the seat with a total of elected in the 2000 Ghanaian General elections with a total of 8,284 votes making 31% of the total votes cast. She contested again during the 2004 General elections and retained her seat with a total of 14,782 votes. She contested again in the 2008 elections and lost her seat to Gabriel Kodwo Essilfie of the National Democratic congress.

Personal life 
Baiden-Amissah is a Christian.

Career 
Baiden-Amissah was also a board member of the Ghana Cylinder manufacturing Company. She was also an Educationist and a Deputy minister of Education, Science and Sports.

References 

New Patriotic Party politicians
1954 births
Living people
Ghanaian MPs 2001–2005
Ghanaian MPs 2005–2009
Government ministers of Ghana
People from Western Region (Ghana)
Ghanaian Christians
21st-century Ghanaian women politicians
21st-century Ghanaian politicians
University of Education, Winneba alumni
Women members of the Parliament of Ghana